The Leo Kottke Anthology is a two-disc compilation of American guitarist Leo Kottke's releases on the Takoma,  Capitol and Chrysalis labels, covering the first 15 years of his career. It includes liner notes by Kottke himself for each song and an essay by Mark Humphrey.

A number of compilations have been made of Kottke's music by his various record labels. Capitol had previously released 1971-1976, The Best and The Best of Leo Kottke. Chrysalis had released Essential and Blue Note released two instrumentals-only compilations in 2003.

Reception

Writing for Allmusic, music critic Richie Unterberger wrote of the album "This has a higher proportion of Kottke's vocals than some might expect, which may mildly disappoint fans who value his guitar virtuosity more than any of his other attributes. It's still a good, well-chosen compilation, leaning most heavily on his first three albums from the late '60s and early '70s, although this comprises less than half the set."

Track listing
All songs by Leo Kottke except as noted.
The songs are sequenced in chronological order according to album release.
The largest representation is from Greenhouse with five tracks included. The least represented is Chewing Pine which contributes only one track.
There are 12 vocal tracks out of 37 (depending how one counts "Side One Suite")
"Easter", "The Medley", and "The Train and the Gate" are live recordings.

Disc one
 "The Driving of the Year Nail" – 1:55
 "Ojo" – 2:12
 "Vaseline Machine Gun" – 3:09
 "Busted Bicycle" – 2:45
 "Cripple Creek" (Traditional) – 1:56
 "Eight Miles High" (Gene Clark, David Crosby, Roger McGuinn) – 3:33
 "Bumblebee" – 3:39
 "Bourree" (J.S. Bach) – 1:26
 "Bean Time" – 2:32
 "Tiny Island" (Al Gaylor) – 3:46
 "In Christ There Is No East Or West" (Traditional) – 2:12
 "Last Steam Engine Train" (John Fahey) – 3:00
 "From the Cradle to the Grave" (Kottke, Ron Nagle) – 3:23
 "Louise" (Paul Siebel) – 4:02
 "Easter" [Live] – 3:18
 "Medley: Crow River Waltz/Jesu, Joy of Man's Desiring/Jack Fig" (Kottke, Johann Sebastian Bach) [Live] – 7:32
 "Pamela Brown" (Tom T. Hall) – 4:03
 "You Tell Me Why" (Ron Elliott) – 3:58
 "Born To Be With You" (Don Robertson) – 3:02

Disc two
 "Mona Ray" – 3:40
 "When Shrimps Learn to Whistle" – 3:28
 "The Scarlatti Rip-off" – 3:32
 "Open Country Joy (Constant Traveler)" (Leo Kottke, John McLaughlin) – 3:39
 "Buckaroo" (Bob Morris) – 2:03
 "The White Ape" – 2:08
 "Range" – 3:24
 "Airproofing" – 2:16
 "Up Tempo" – 1:40
 "Endless Sleep" (Nick Lowe) – 3:37
 "Sonora’s Death Row" (Kevin Blackie Farrell) – 4:30
 "Embryonic Journey" (Jorma Kaukonen) – 3:15
 "Learning The Game" (Buddy Holly) – 4:06
 "The Train and The Gate" [Live] – 3:02
 "Side One Suite:"
 "Some Birds" – 0:59
 "Sounds Like..." – 1:28
 "Slang" – 2:42
 "My Double" – 2:05
 "Three Walls and Bars" – 2:13
 "Reprise: Some Birds" – :59
 "Sleep Walk" (Johnny Farina, Santo Farina, Ann Farina) – 2:23
 "Rings" (Alex Harvey, Eddie Reeves)– 2:45
 "Julie’s House" – 3:17

Personnel
Leo Kottke - 6 & 12-string guitar, vocals
David Kemper - drums
David Miner – bass
Albert Lee - guitar
Emmylou Harris - background vocals
Kenny Buttrey – drums
Paul Lagos - drums
Michael Johnson - guitar
Mike Leech – bass
Roy Estrada - bass
Bobby Ogdin - piano
John Harris – piano
Bill Berg – drums
Bill Peterson – bass
Bill Barber – piano, synthesizer
Production notes:
Compilation Producers - James Austin and Rick Clark
Liner notes - Mark Humphrey and Leo Kottke
Remastering  - Ron McMaster
Design - Maria Villar

References

External links
Leo Kottke's official site
Unofficial Leo Kottke web site (fan site)

Leo Kottke compilation albums
1997 compilation albums
Rhino Records compilation albums
Albums produced by Denny Bruce